Molly McClimon Watcke (born 10 April 1971) is an American long-distance runner who competes in distances from 1500 metres to the marathon.

College career
She was a multiple time cross country and track and field All-American and Big Ten Conference champion for the University of Michigan.  She was inducted into the University of Michigan Hall of Honor.

Cross country career
At the 1998 IAAF World Cross Country Championships she finished 25th in the short race, earning a team bronze medal.

At the 1999 IAAF World Cross Country Championships she finished 74th in the short race.

Road running career
She has multiple top-3 finishes in the Columbus Marathon.

References

External links
 

1971 births
Living people
American female long-distance runners
American female marathon runners
Michigan Wolverines women's track and field athletes
Michigan Wolverines women's cross country runners
20th-century American women